Chaudri Mohammad Naeem (date of birth unknown), best known as Mohammad Naeem, was a Pakistani cricketer. From Lahore, Mohammad made his first-class debut during the 1959–60 season, playing two matches for Lahore in the Quaid-e-Azam Trophy. During the following season, he played a further match for Lahore, in the Ayub Trophy. This was followed by a single appearance for a Punjab Governor's XI against Punjab University, in which he took three catches and effected three stumpings while playing as the team's wicket-keeper. For the 1961–62 season of the Quaid-e-Azam Trophy, Lahore was split into two separate teams—Lahore "A" and Lahore "B". Mohammad played three further first-class matches for Lahore "A" as a top-order batsman. His highest score (and only half-century) was an innings of 56 runs against Multan in November 1961, which included a partnership of 93 runs with Iftikhar Bukhtari (106) for the second wicket.

References

20th-century births
Lahore cricketers
Lahore A cricketers
Living people
Pakistani cricketers
Cricketers from Lahore
Place of birth missing (living people)
Year of birth missing (living people)
Wicket-keepers